Battersea Park refers to the park in London, England.  It may also refer to;

Railway stations
Battersea Park railway station, a railway station near the park
Battersea Park Road railway station, a railway station that closed in 1916
Battersea Park railway station (1860–1870), a closed railway station near the park

Disasters
Battersea Park rail crash, a 1937 railway crash near the park in which 10 people died
Battersea Park funfair disaster, a 1972 roller coaster disaster in the park that resulted in 5 deaths and 13 injuries

Other uses
Battersea Park Street Circuit, a former motor racing circuit
Battersea Park School, former name of Harris Academy Battersea